An agent of influence is an agent of some stature who uses their position to influence public opinion or decision making to produce results beneficial to the country whose intelligence service operates the agent. Agents of influence are often the most difficult agents to detect, as there is seldom material evidence that connects them with a foreign power, but they can be among the most effective means of influencing foreign opinion and actions as they hold considerable credibility among the target audience. Most commonly they serve the interests of a foreign power in one of three ways: either as a controlled agent directly recruited and controlled by a foreign power; as a "trusted contact" that consciously collaborates to advance foreign interests but is not directly recruited or controlled by a foreign power; or as a "useful idiot" that is completely unaware of how their actions further the interests of a foreign power.

The term "agent of influence" is often used to describe both individuals and organizations engaged in influence operations. Individuals engaged in this type of influence operation may serve in the fields of journalism, government, art, labor, academia, or a number of other professional fields. Cultural opinion makers, nationalists, and religious leaders have also been targeted to serve as individual agents of influence.

In addition to individual agents of influence, front organizations can serve the interests of a foreign power in this capacity. Some Cold War examples of front organizations serving as agents of influence, focusing largely on the Soviet side, were many "peace" groups: the Christian Peace Conference, the International Organization of Journalists, the World Federation of Scientific Workers, the World Federation of Trade Unions, the International Institute for Peace, and the World Peace Council. When individuals join such organizations in good faith but are in fact serving the interests of a foreign elite, their affiliation becomes infiltration, and cumulatively the organization serves as an agent of influence.

U.S. government definitions
  An agent of some stature who uses their position to influence public opinion or decision making to produce results beneficial to the country whose intelligence service operates the agent (Air Force Office of Special Investigations Manual 71-142).
 A person who is directed by an intelligence organization to use his or her position to influence public opinion or decision-making in a manner that will advance the objective of the country for which that organization operates (Counterintelligence Glossary—Terms & Definitions of Interest for Department of Defense Counterintelligence Professionals).
 An individual who acts in the interest of an adversary without open declaration of allegiance and attempts to exercise influence covertly, but is not necessarily gathering intelligence or compromising classified material, is known as an agent of influence (Historical Dictionary of Cold War Counterintelligence).
 An agent operating under intelligence instructions who uses his or her officialdom or public position, and other means, to exert influence on policy, public opinion, the course of particular events, the activity of political organizations and state agencies in target countries (KGB Lexicon: The Soviet Intelligence Officer's Handbook, edited by KGB archivist Vasiliy Mitrokhin).
 The Foreign Agents Registration Act (FARA) was enacted in 1938, and 22 U.S.Code § 611 et seq provides detailed definitions of what constitutes an agent of influence.

Characteristics

The primary characteristic that distinguishes agents of influence from spies is the lack of absolute control exercised by the foreign power on an agent of influence. According to Angelo Codevilla, the work of an agent of influence "can be far more valuable, subtle, and dangerous than that of a mere spy". As witnessed in the Cold War through "fellow travelers", the best agents of influence were those whose interests paralleled that of the aggressor's and needed little if any coordination. A foreign power can rarely exercise complete control over an agent of influence, as these agents possess their own preferences and motivations; the most proven way to cultivate the desired results is for a foreign power to choose and develop an agent of influence whose interests already align with their own. Overlooking an agent of influence's different motivations can have negative consequences, as witnessed in World War I, when German political warfare strategists sent Vladimir Lenin back to St. Petersburg in an effort to foster domestic instability and get Russia out of the war in 1917. Since Lenin had different motivations and interests than the German government at the time, he acted in a manner not suited to German interests, and grew so powerful that his party was instrumental to bringing down Imperial Germany.

Excessive efforts to control or exploit agents of influence can also have negative consequences. Such agents are best seen as strategic or tactical allies, and efforts to exercise too much control over them may result in the loss of an influence asset. Excessive exploitation of these agents can lead to their exposure by forcing them to take questionably one-sided positions, as witnessed in the exposure of Norwegian Arne Treholt. Because these agents exercise influence, their positions and opinions are not wholly secret, but the level to which they coordinate activities with a hostile power is likely to be kept secret.

Agents of influence are most effective because they bring with them a sense of credibility among the target audience, and they use this credibility to convey a story or manipulate a situation in favor of the foreign power with which they share common preferences and motivations. This credibility makes agents of influence so effective that, according to Angelo Codevilla, using these agents is an act of war "in the same sense that armies crashing across border or airplanes dropping bombs are acts of war because their results can be as intrusive or conclusive as the results of armies or bombs."

Known agents of influence

Individuals operating as an agent of influence may serve in the fields of journalism, government, art, labor, academia, or a number of other professional fields. Cultural opinion makers, nationalists, and religious leaders have also been targeted to serve as individual agents of influence. The following are some notable individuals that have been accused of being foreign agents of influence. The list is not exhaustive but is meant to show the wide range in which such agents can operate. As previously noted, proving someone is an agent of influence is among the most difficult endeavors, even for the most skilled counterintelligence officers.

 Eli Cohen: Egyptian-born Israeli spy. He is best known for his espionage work in 1961–65 in Syria, where he developed close relationships with the Syrian political and military hierarchy. Cohen was under consideration to be named the Syrian Deputy Minister of Defense.
 Alger Hiss: an agent of influence and spy. At the time of his exposure he had significant support among US politicians and only went to jail for lying under oath about passing documents to the Soviet Union.
 Arne Herløv Petersen: used as a Soviet agent of influence in Norway for over 10 years, he mainly focused on various means of manipulating Danish public opinion.
 Arne Treholt: he was exposed as a result of overuse as an agent of influence in taking blatantly one-sided arguments over Norway's northern border.
 Rose O'Neal Greenhow: Confederate spy and accused agent of influence working among the British.
 Peter Matthiessen: Writer and former covert CIA operative who admittedly established the Paris Review as a front for his agency activities.
 Edith von Coler: Pro-Nazi propagandist and agent of influence who helped to bring Romania into the Axis.
 Richard Gott: Guardian journalist who took money from the KGB.

Organizational functioning

In addition to individual agents of influence, front organizations can serve the interests of a foreign power in this capacity. When individuals join such organizations in good faith but are in fact serving the interests of a foreign elite, their affiliation becomes infiltration, and cumulatively the organization serves as an agent of influence. It is important to note, however, that not all front organizations focus exclusively on influence operations, as some have more specific objectives (intelligence collection, etc.). The Cold War is a recent example of increased use of not only front organizations, but of front organizations being used as agents of influence to alter the target nation's belief system and policies on the international stage.

The use of organizations as agents of influence during the Cold War is a recent example that serves to illustrate how frequently front organizations were used in an attempt to alter the perceptions and actions of a foreign nation and its public. A Communist front organization is an organization identified to be a front organization under the effective control of a Communist party, the Communist International or other Communist organizations. Lenin originated the idea in his manifesto of 1902, "What Is to Be Done?". Since the party was illegal in Russia, he proposed to reach the masses through "a large number of other organizations intended for wide membership and, which, therefore, can be as loose and as public as possible." Generally called "mass organizations" by the Communists themselves, these groups were prevalent from the 1920s through the 1950s, with their use accelerating during the Popular Front period of the 1930s.

Starting in 1939, Attorney General Biddle began compiling a list of Fascist and Communist front organizations. It was called "Attorney General's List of Subversive Organizations" (AGLOSO), but was not at first made public.  Political pressures from Congress forced President Harry S. Truman to act. Truman's Attorney General Tom C. Clark expanded the list, which was officially authorized by presidential Executive Order 9835 in 1947 and was administered by the new Loyalty Review Board. The Board became part of the Civil Service Commission. The list was used by federal agencies to screen appointments during the Truman Administration.  The program investigated over 3 million government employees, of whom 300 were dismissed as security risks. Adverse decisions could be appealed to the Loyalty Review Board, a government agency set up by President Truman.

The Loyalty Review Board publicized the previously secret Attorney General's list in March 1948 as a "List of Communist classified organizations." The list gave the name and date founded, and (for active groups) the headquarters, and chief officers.

In 1955, SSIS published a list of what it described as the 82 most active and typical sponsors of communist fronts in the United States; some of those named had literally dozens of affiliations with groups that had either been cited as Communist fronts or had been labelled "subversive" by either the subcommittee or the House Committee on Un-American Activities.

See also
 McCarthyism
 Mole (espionage)
 Red Scare
 Sleeper agent
 Useful idiot

References

External links
Interview with Ralph de Toledano
 
Agents of Influence—from Soviet Active Measures in the "Post-Cold War Era" 1988–1991
The United States Department of Justice - The Foreign Agents Registration Act (FARA)

Psychological warfare techniques
Spies by role
Social influence
Majority–minority relations